Bryan Christopher Sears (born March 28, 1982) is an American sprinter who specializes in the 100 meters and 200 metres. He participated in the 1999 World Youth Championships in Athletics, winning silver and bronze, respectively, over these distances.

A native of Hinesville, Georgia, Sears attended Liberty County High School. He beat Jamel Ashley twice during his sophomore year in 1998, the only high school sprinter to do so.

Sears later attended the University of Florida.

References

External links

DyeStat profile for Bryan Sears
Florida Gators bio

1982 births
Living people
People from Hinesville, Georgia
American male sprinters
African-American male track and field athletes
Florida Gators men's track and field athletes
21st-century African-American sportspeople
20th-century African-American people